Jonathan Turner may refer to:
Jonathan Baldwin Turner (1805–1899), American educational reformer
Jonathan D. C. Turner (born 1958), British barrister
Jonathan H. Turner, American sociologist
Jonathan Turner (Boy Meets World), a character in Boy Meets World
Jonathan S. Turner, American computer scientist 
Jon Turner, British yacht builder

See also 
John Turner (disambiguation)